The Pesquería River, is a river of Mexico. It is a tributary of the San Juan River, which in turn flows into the Rio Grande.

See also
 List of rivers of Mexico
 List of tributaries of the Rio Grande

References

Atlas of Mexico, 1975
The Prentice Hall American World Atlas, 1984.
Rand McNally, The New International Atlas, 1993.

Tributaries of the Rio Grande
Rivers of Mexico